The International Maj Lind Piano Competition is a competition organized by the Sibelius Academy that takes place
in Helsinki, Finland.
Originally a national competition that was first held in 1945, it was opened to international competitors in 2002 and
has since then been held every five years.

In 2022, prize money of over €100,000 was awarded.

The competition is named after Maria (Maj) Lind, née Kopjeff (1876–1942).

References 

Music competitions in Finland